Robin Haase and Rogier Wassen were the defending champions, but Haase decided not to participate.
Wassen played alongside Jesse Huta Galung. They were eliminated already in the first round.

Julian Knowle and Michael Kohlmann won the title, defeating Colin Ebelthite and Adam Feeney 2–6, 7–5, [10–5] in the final.

Seeds

Draw

Draw

References
 Main Draw

Zucchetti Kos Tennis Cup - Doubles
Internazionali di Tennis del Friuli Venezia Giulia
Zucchetti